Glenodinium is a genus of dinoflagellates with unknown classification.

The genus was first described by Christian Gottfried Ehrenberg in 1836.

Species:
 Glenodinium foliaceum
 Glenodinium oculatum
 Glenodinium paululum

References

Dinophyceae